Maria, Lady Walpole ( Skerret, Skerritt, or Skerrett; 1702 – 4 June 1738) was the second wife of British politician and Prime Minister Robert Walpole from before 3 March 1738 until her death in childbirth (miscarriage) three months later. She was buried in the Church of St Martin on the Walpole estate at Houghton Hall in Norfolk, England.

Biography

Lady Walpole was the only known daughter of Thomas Skerret, a wealthy London merchant. On her marriage to Walpole in 1738 she paid a dowry of £30,000.
 
Walpole had become estranged from his first wife, Catherine, and took a series of mistresses. Maria Skerret was a long term companion (1723–1738) as they lived together in both Richmond and Houghton Hall in Norfolk while Walpole's first wife was still alive. Miss Skerret was received everywhere, and moved in fashionable society. She was even alluded to as Polly in The Beggar's Opera written in 1728 by John Gay, in which 'Macheath' was Walpole.

Lady Walpole was also often mentioned in the letters of Lady Mary Wortley Montagu as 'Molly'. "I see every body but converse with nobody but 'des amies choisses'; in the first rank of these are Lady Stafford and dear Molly Skerritt, both of whom have now the additional merit of being old acquaintances, and never having given me any reason to complain of either of 'em."

Walpole was created Earl of Orford after he retired from the premiership in 1742, and he used his influence with King George II to have his illegitimate daughter by Lady Walpole, Maria, granted the rank and precedence of an earl's daughter, so she became "Lady Maria Walpole". Daughter Maria was born between 1723 and 1734, and later married Colonel Charles Churchill of Chalfont, with whom she had two daughters.

Styles 
Miss Maria Skerritt (1702–1738)
Lady Walpole (1738–1738)

See also
 Spouses of the Prime Ministers of the United Kingdom

Sources
The genealogy of 750,000 people connected to European Royalty, Ee-familytree.net. Accessed 23 September 2017.

Citations
 Charles Mosley, editor, Burke's Peerage, Baronetage & Knightage, 107th edition, 3 volumes (Wilmington, Delaware, U.S.A.: Burke's Peerage (Genealogical Books) Ltd, 2003), volume 3, page 4059.

 

1702 births
1738 deaths
Deaths in childbirth
People from Houghton, Norfolk
Spouses of prime ministers of the United Kingdom
Wives of knights
Robert Walpole
Maria